Ecaterina Orb-Lazăr (born 7 May 1935) is a Romanian fencer. She competed at the 1956 and 1960 Summer Olympics.

References

1935 births
Living people
Romanian female fencers
Olympic fencers of Romania
Fencers at the 1956 Summer Olympics
Fencers at the 1960 Summer Olympics
People from Turda